Pastora Peña Martínez-Illescas (1920–2003) was a Spanish film actress. Her brother was the actor Luis Peña.

Filmography

References

Bibliography 
 Labanyi, Jo & Pavlović, Tatjana. A Companion to Spanish Cinema. John Wiley & Sons, 2012.

External links 
 

1920 births
2003 deaths
Spanish film actresses
Spanish television actresses
People from Madrid